Pernoud is a surname. Notable people with the surname include:

 Georges Pernoud (1947–2021), French TV presenter of documentary series Thalassa
 Régine Pernoud (1909–1998), French historian and medievalist